Acidon bigrammica is a moth of the family Erebidae first described by Max Saalmüller in 1880. It is found in Madagascar.

References

Moths of Africa
Moths described in 1880
Erebidae
Hypeninae